Pádraig Ó hÉigeartaigh (1871–1936) was an Irish poet.

Life
A native of Uíbh Ráthach, County Kerry, Ó hÉigeartaigh emigrated as a child to Springfield, Massachusetts, where he raised a family and worked in the clothing business.

During the Gaelic revival, Ó hÉigeartaigh wrote a regular Irish-language column titled Ón dhomhan diar, about the hardships faced by Irish immigrants in the United States for Patrick Pearse's An Claidheamh Soluis.

Ó hÉigeartaigh also wrote poetry for the same publication in Munster Irish. His poem Ochón! a Dhonncha ("My Sorrow, Dhonncha!"), a lament for the drowning of his six-year-old son on 22 August 1905, appeared in Pearse's magazine in 1906. At the time, authors of the Gaelic revival preferred to write in the Classical Gaelic, the literary language once common to the Gaels of both Ireland and Scotland, and felt scorn for the oral poetry of the Gaeltachtaí. Ó hÉigeartaigh, however, drew upon that very tradition to express his grief and proved that it could still be used very effectively by an early 20th-century poet. Ó hÉigeartaigh's lament for the drowning of his son has a permanent place in the literary canon of Irish poetry in the Irish language and has been translated into English by both Patrick Pearse and Thomas Kinsella.

See also
 Gaelic revival
Irish language outside Ireland

References

 The New Oxford Book of Irish Verse, pp. 316–317, p. 407, ed. Thomas Kinsella, Oxford University Press, 1986. .

Irish poets
Irish-language poets
People from County Kerry
1871 births
1936 deaths
19th-century Irish people
20th-century Irish people
Irish emigrants to the United States (before 1923)
American Irish-language poets
American poets of Irish descent
People from Springfield, Massachusetts
Writers from Springfield, Massachusetts
Poets from Massachusetts
20th-century Irish-language poets